This is a list of banks in Qatar.

Central bank 
Qatar Central Bank (QCB)

Local banks 

 New entity after International Bank of Qatar and Barwa Bank merged.

Foreign banks

See also 
 List of banks in the Arab world

References

Qatar
Banks
Banks

Qatar